Cordillera de Sama Biological Reserve is a protected area in Bolivia located in the Tarija Department, in the Cercado Province, Eustaquio Méndez Province, and José María Avilés Province. It protects part of the Central Andean puna and Bolivian montane dry forests ecoregions.

See also 
 Laguna Grande
 Tajzara Lake
 Baritú National Park

References

External links 
 www.sernap.gov.bo / Cordillera de Sama Biological Reserve 
 Cordillera de Sama Biological Reserve 
 General information (5 pages) 

Nature reserves in Bolivia
Geography of Tarija Department
Protected areas established in 1991
1991 establishments in Bolivia